Cubitis is an unincorporated community in DeSoto County, Florida, United States, located approximately  north of Arcadia on U.S. Route 17.

Geography

References

Unincorporated communities in DeSoto County, Florida
Unincorporated communities in Florida